Esaw is a surname. Notable people with the surname include:

Johnny Esaw (1925–2013), Canadian sports broadcaster and television network executive
Kofi Esaw, Togolese politician and diplomat